Darband-e Olya (also Romanized as Darband-e ‘Olyā; also known as Ma‘dan-e Āqdarband and Aq Darband) is a village in Marzdaran Rural District, Marzdaran District, Sarakhs County, Razavi Khorasan Province, Iran. At the 2006 census, its population was 52, in 14 families.

References 

Populated places in Sarakhs County